Alice Cooper Bailey (December 9, 1890 – February 1, 1978) was an American writer of children's books and articles for periodicals. She is best known for the books Katrina and Jan and Kimo.

Early life and education 
Bailey was born on December 9, 1890 in San Diego, California, daughter of Henry Ernest Cooper and Mary Ellen, née Porter.  Her family moved to Honolulu, Hawaii, when she was a baby. She attended Wellesley College, Oahu College, the University of Hawaii, the Boston Music Conservatory, and received a lifetime teaching diploma from the Honolulu Normal School.

Career 

Bailey published seven books. Unpublished works included a children's history of Hawaii, to be called The Flying Umbrella, and the story of her father, a former judge, minister of Foreign Affairs, and first Secretary of the Territory of Hawaii. She wrote short stories and articles for periodicals, including American Girl, Child Life, Story Parade, and Travel.

She was a member of the Boston Authors Club.

Personal life 
Bailey married George William Bailey in 1913, and had three children. She later separated from her husband, and lived in Weston, Massachusetts. She died in Concord, Massachusetts, on 1 February 1978.

Selected works 

Bailey, Alice Cooper, and Herman Rosse. Katrina and Jan. New York: P. F. Volland, 1923. 
Bailey, Alice Cooper. The Skating Gander. New York: Wise-Parslow Co, 1927. 
Bailey, Alice Cooper, and Lucille Webster Holling. Kimo. New York, N.Y.: Wise-Parslow, 1928. 
Bailey, Alice Cooper, Loretta Phillips, and Prentice Phillips. Sun Gold: A Story of the Hawaiian Islands. Boston: Houghton Mifflin Co, 1930. 
Bailey, Alice Cooper. Footprints in the Dust. New York: Longmans, Green, 1936. 
Bailey, Alice Cooper, and Yukio Tashiro. The Hawaiian Box Mystery. New York: David McKay Co, 1962. 
Bailey, Alice Cooper. To Remember Robert Louis Stevenson. New York: McKay, 1966.

References 

20th-century American women writers
1890 births
1978 deaths
American children's writers